Loch Arthur (also known as Loch Lotus) is a lake in the council area of Dumfries and Galloway in Scotland near the village of Beeswing.

Loch Arthur lies to the east of the village of Beeswing and has been claimed as the setting for the Arthurian story of the Lady of the Lake.

Prehistoric lake dwellings (crannogs) were formerly on this lake. A logboat and possible paddle have been found.

Loch Arthur Camphill Community is a farm near the loch where people with disabilities, volunteers and staff produce organic cheese, butter and other foods.

References

 Robert Munro: Ancient Scottish lake-dwellings or crannogs : with a supplementary chapter on remains of lake-dwellings in England 1882
 Nicholas Dixon: The history of crannog survey and excavation in Scotland 2007
 Ian Morrison: Landscape with lake dwellings: the crannogs of Scotland Edinburgh University Press 1986 ISBN 085224522X
 Robert J. C. Mowat: The logboats of Scotland, with notes on related artefact types, Oxbow Monograph series, No. 68. Oxford. 1996, S. 78–9

External links
Loch Arthur Camphill Community

Arthur